Monggo bread, known in the Philippines as pan de monggo, is a  Filipino bread with a distinctive filling made from mung bean or adzuki bean paste. The bread used can come in a wide variety of shapes and recipes, ranging from buns, to ensaymada-like rolls, to loaves. It is one of the most common types of breads in the Philippines. It is usually eaten for merienda.

See also
Hopia
Pan de regla
Pan de coco
Pandesal

References 

Breads
Yeast breads
Southeast Asian breads
Philippine breads